Patrick Davis may refer to:

 Patrick Davis (musician), American singer-songwriter, musician, and record producer
 Patrick Davis (politics), American political consultant and strategist
 Patrick Davis (ice hockey) (born 1986), American ice hockey player